The 1911 SAFL Grand Final was an Australian rules football competition. West Adelaide beat Port Adelaide by 51 to 46.

Scorecard

References 

SANFL Grand Finals
SAFL Grand Final, 1911